Theodoros Zoumpoulidis (Greek: Θεόδωρος Ζουμπουλίδης; born c. 1981), better known as Theo Alexander, is a Greek actor appearing on stage, in film and on television.
He had a role in the 2007 Greek film El Greco, but is perhaps best known internationally for his multi-episode appearance as Talbot in U.S. supernatural drama series True Blood.

Early life and education

He was born as Theodoros Zoumpoulidis in Athens.

Alexander received a Bachelor of Arts degree in business science from Boston University, and then enrolled to study acting in New York City, New York, at the Circle in the Square Theatre School, a private drama school associated with the Circle in the Square Theatre and, as such, the only accredited school attached to a Broadway theatre. He first appeared in television series such as CSI: NY and Pushing Daisies, but his career took off in 2007 with the episode "Chuck vs. the sausages" of the television series Chuck, where he played the role of the Greek mafioso Demitrios Stavros.

In 2010 Alexander began working on a self-written project, "Love and Let Die".  He was also working on other projects as a producer and writer.

Alexander enjoys martial arts and kick-boxing.

Career

Filmography

Television work

References

Major Crimes as Burning Man season 3 episode 19

External links

Greek male film actors
Greek male television actors
Boston University School of Management alumni
Circle in the Square Theatre School alumni
Male actors from Athens
Living people
Year of birth uncertain
Date of birth missing (living people)
Greek male stage actors
1981 births